Dr. Simin Nikbin Meydani, D.V.M., Ph.D., is an Iranian-American Nutrition Scientist, Professor and the currently the Vice Provost of Research at Tufts University.

She is the lab director of the Nutrition and Immunology Lab at the Jean Mayer Human Nutrition Research Center on Aging at Tufts University (HNRCA), Professor of Nutrition and Immunology at the Friedman School of Nutrition Science and Policy and the Tufts Sackler Graduate Program in Immunology.

Biography
Meydani was born in Tehran, Iran and was educated at Hadaf High School in Tehran. She received her D.V.M. degree in Veterinary Medicine from University of Tehran in 1975, a master's degree in Nutrition from Colorado State University in 1977 and a Doctor of Nutrition degree from Iowa State University  in 1981. She was a Postdoctoral Research Fellow in Nutrition at the Harvard School of Public Health from 1981-1983 and then was  appointed Senior Research Associate in the Department of Biology at Brandeis University from 1983-1984. She additionally  earned a certificate in Molecular Immunology at the Marine Biological Laboratory, Woods Hole, MA in 1985.
 
In 1984, Meydani joined the Human Nutrition Research Center on Aging (HNRCA) at Tufts University as a visiting scientist. After 6 years of research positions there, she  became   Lab Director of the Nutritional Immunology Laboratory at the Center in 1990.
She was also a  Hedwig van Amerigen Executive Leadership fellow in the Academic Medicine Program at Drexel University College of Medicine in Philadelphia, PA in 2006.

Vice Provost for Research at Tufts University
Meydani was named the Vice Provost for research in September 2016.

Scientific work
According to her profile at   Tufts, her  scientific interests include the impact of nutrition on the aging process and age-associated diseases; role of nutrition on immune and inflammatory responses and predisposition to infectious diseases in developed and less developed countries.

Awards and recognitions

Awards

 Iowa State University, Alumni Life Time Achievement Award, 2013
 Helen LeBaron Hilton Distinguished Alumni Award, Iowa State University, 2011
 Food Science and Human Nutrition Alumni Impact Award, Iowa State University, 2011
 Robert H. Herman Award in Clinical Nutrition, American Society of Nutrition, 2008
 Denham Harman Life Time Research Achievement Award, American Aging Association, 2003
 Grace Goldsmith Award. American College of Nutrition, 2001
 American Institute of Nutrition Lederle Award in Human Nutrition, 1998
 Tufts University Faculty Recognition for Outstanding Achievement (1995–96, 1997-1998)
 International Nutritional Immunology Group Award, 1993
 International HERMES Vitamin Research Award, 1993
 Denham Harman Lecture Award of American College of Advancement in Medicine, 1990
 USDA-ARS Citation of Merit for manuscript "Vitamin E Enhances Cell-Mediated Immunity in Healthy Elderly Subjects," Meydani et al., Am J Clin Nutr 52:557-563, 1990."
 Pahlavi Royal Gold Medal for outstanding Tehran University college graduate, 1975
 Alborz Institute Award as valedictorian of Tehran University Veterinary School class, 1975

Honors
 2012-13 Vice-President elect, American Society for Nutrition, President 2014
 Jean Andrews Centennial Visiting Professorship, University of Texas, Austin, Texas, 2010
 Hedwig van Amerigen Executive Leadership in Academic Medicine Program (Drexel University College of Medicine), 2005-2006
 President, American Aging Association, 2005-2006
 Malcolm Trout Annual Visiting Scholar. Michigan State University, 2001
 Welcome Visiting Professorship, Iowa State University, 1998

Other activities
 Co-chair and Organizer, FASEB Summer Conference on Nutrition and Immune Response, 2003, 2007, 2011
 Co-organizer, Women in Science & Medicine Symposium for American Society for Nutrition at Experimental Biology 2010, Anaheim, California.
 Chair, Tufts Women in Science, Engineering and Medicine Symposium, 2008, Boston, MA
 Organizer and Chair: Aging: Mechanism and Prevention: 35th Annual Meeting of AGE, Boston, June 2006.
 Organizing Committee, First and Second International Aging and Immunology Meeting, 1998, 2001
 Chair and Organizing Committee, International Life Sciences Institute Conference on Nutrition and Immunity, 1997

Professional affiliations
 American Society of Nutrition, Vice President-Elect
 American Aging Association, Board Member
 American College of Nutrition, Chair, Council on Immunology, Hematology, and Oncology

Selected publications
Her most cited papers   are 
Meydani S, Meydani M, Blumberg JB, et al. "Vitamin E Supplementation and In Vivo Immune Response in Healthy Elderly Subjects: A Randomized Controlled Trial". JAMA. 1997; 277(17):1380-1386. doi:10.1001/jama.1997.03540410058031 (cited by 560 articles in Google Scholar) 
S N Meydani, et al.  "Vitamin E supplementation enhances cell-mediated immunity in healthy elderly subjects. " American Journal of Clinical Nutrition September 1990 vol. 52 no. 3 557-563

References

Year of birth missing (living people)
Living people
American people of Iranian descent
People from Tehran
Tufts University faculty
University of Tehran alumni
Colorado State University alumni
Iowa State University faculty
Harvard School of Public Health faculty
Brandeis University faculty